Shahidun Nessa Rahman (née Karim ; born 14 December 1971), commonly known by her pseudonym Shahida Rahman, is an English author, writer and publisher. She is best known as the author of Lascar.

Early life
Rahman was born in Mill Road Maternity Hospital, Mill Road, Cambridge, and brought up in Cambridge, Cambridgeshire, England. She is of Bangladeshi descent and both her parents are from Fenchuganj, Sylhet District. Her late father, Abdul Karim, was orphaned at a young age and moved to Cambridge from East Pakistan (now Bangladesh) in 1957 and her mother, Fultera Banoo Karim, arrived in 1963. Rahman has two older brothers, and her father was a restaurateur.

Writing career
Rahman writes historical fiction, non-fiction and short stories. Since 2003, Rahman has been a freelance writer. In April 2005, she launched Perfect Publishers Ltd, a print-on-demand book publishing company providing a range of services for authors and other publishers.

In June 2012, her first historical novel Lascar was published by Indigo Dreams Publishing. Lascar was inspired by stories passed down orally through the generations about one of her paternal ancestors who one of the early lascars (sailor/seaman from East India) to work aboard the British steamships of the 19th century. It was shortlisted for the Muslim Writers Awards, Unpublished Novel Award in 2008 and longlisted for the Brit Writers Unpublished Award in 2010.

In 2009, she was commissioned to write a radio play for the Lascar Heritage Project for Silsila Productions which aired in 2011. In 2010, she co-wrote the screenplay India Ink with American screenwriter Halle Eavelyn which was based on Rahman's short story Homecoming. In 2011, India Ink was shortlisted for the Circalit First Draft Contest and reached the finals of the WriteMovies International Writing Contest.

She wrote The Integration of the Hijab into Police Uniforms which was published in the Behind the Hijab anthology, in March 2009 by Monsoon Press.

Other works of Rahman include: The Integration of the Hijab into Police Uniforms, The Lascar (radio play), and short stories and articles: Currying Favour, Backbone of the Fleet, The Life of Lascars Aboard Merchant Ships, Cambridge's first Gurdwara, Bangladeshis Trade Curry for College and Taxis, Baishaki Mela, Asian Women Suffragettes in the 1900s, Travel with Kids, The Middle Child Syndrome and Noor Inayat Khan.

Rahman has contributed to and been published in the Best of British, The Great War and SISTERS magazines, Asian World Newspaper, Children of the New Earth, The Huffington Post and BBC Radio Cambridgeshire. She was a columnist at Weekly Desh newspaper.

Rahman is currently working on her second historical novel about an Indian Ayah. Since 2014, she has been on the judging panel of the Young Muslim Writers Awards.

Rahman is the former presenter of 'Book Reviews' at online TV channel LB24tv.

Political career
In May 2015, Rahman was a Liberal Democrat council candidate for East Chesterton ward in the Cambridge City Council election prior to the general election. She received 1,165 votes and lost to the Labour Party candidate who had 1,630 votes.

In May 2016, Rahman was a Liberal Democrat prospective councillor candidate for East Chesterton ward for the second time in the Cambridge City Council election. She received 906 votes, a swing of 6% of votes compared to 2015. She lost to the Labour Party candidate who had 1,103 votes.

Awards and nominations
In April 2013, Rahman was awarded a Channel S 'Special Acknowledgement Award' for her work drawing attention to the forgotten Bangladeshi cultural history and heritage. In January 2015, she was awarded the Arts and Culture Awareness award at the British Muslim Awards.

Personal life
In 1990, at the age of 18, Rahman got married. She has three sons Ibrahim, Imran, Aniq and a daughter, Aminah.

Novels

See also
 British Bangladeshi
 List of British Bangladeshis
 List of English writers
 List of Muslim writers and poets

References

External links
 
 
 Shahida Rahman on The Huffington Post
 Vajpeyi, Yogesh. Subject of lascars is under-represented in the UK’. The Indian Express. 24 March 2013

1971 births
Living people
English Sunni Muslims
English people of Bangladeshi descent
English historical novelists
English women novelists
English literary historians
Women historical novelists
English columnists
American women columnists
English screenwriters
Muslim writers
British Asian writers
21st-century English writers
21st-century English women writers
Liberal Democrats (UK) politicians
English women in politics
British politicians of Bangladeshi descent
HuffPost writers and columnists
People from Cambridge
English women non-fiction writers
Women literary historians
British women historians
People from Fenchuganj Upazila
Bangladeshi Muslims
21st-century Bengalis
20th-century Bengalis
21st-century American women
Pseudonymous women writers
21st-century pseudonymous writers